Rheidol Falls railway station is a railway station serving Rheidol Falls in Ceredigion in Mid-Wales.  It is an intermediate station and request stop on the preserved narrow gauge 1 ft 11¾ in (603 mm) Vale of Rheidol Railway.

Access
The station is inaccessible by road. A footpath leads from the valley floor to a level crossing, and then on up the hill above the line. The footpath is well-used by walkers.

Facilities
The station has had limited facilities during its lifetime, despite being open throughout the history of the railway, except for a short closure during World War Two. Following the provision of grant money from the European Union for rural community infrastructure investment, the station was considerably developed during 2013 and now has a raised-level and surfaced platform, fencing and an attractive period (replica) station building.

References

Heritage railway stations in Ceredigion
Vale of Rheidol Railway stations
Railway stations in Great Britain opened in 1903
Railway stations in Great Britain closed in 1939
Railway stations in Great Britain opened in 1945
Railway stations in Great Britain without road access